The Coastal States Building is a high-rise office building located at 260 Peachtree Street in Downtown Atlanta, Georgia. The building was completed in 1971, and designed by Sidney R. Barrett & Associates. It has 27 floors. The building underwent a $28 million renovation that was completed in 2001. It is similar in design to Regions Center in Birmingham, Alabama.

See also
Architecture of Atlanta
List of tallest buildings in Atlanta

References

External links
 Emporis

Office buildings completed in 1971
Skyscraper office buildings in Atlanta